Mitchell Evan Haniger (born December 23, 1990) is an American professional baseball outfielder for the San Francisco Giants of Major League Baseball (MLB). He has previously played in MLB for the Arizona Diamondbacks and Seattle Mariners.

A collegiate All-American for California Polytechnic State University, San Luis Obispo, in 2012, the Milwaukee Brewers selected Haniger in the supplemental section of the first round of the 2012 MLB draft. He was traded to the Diamondbacks in 2014, made his MLB debut with them in 2016, and was traded to the Mariners after the season. Haniger was an All Star in 2018.

Amateur career

High school
Haniger attended Archbishop Mitty High School in San Jose, California, part of the West Catholic Athletic League. Haniger was a star two-sport athlete for Archbishop Mitty. In baseball, he batted in the .370s and showed near the top among prep home run hitters on the diamond. In football, he raked up 75 catches for 789 yards and 5 touchdowns as a wide receiver on the school's team.

College
Haniger was recruited as an athlete by California Polytechnic State University (Cal Poly San Luis Obispo), Cal State Fullerton, University of California, Berkeley, the University of Oregon, UC Santa Barbara, and UC Davis, all of whom wanted Haniger to play on their college baseball team. The New York Mets selected Haniger in the 31st round of the 2009 Major League Baseball (MLB) Draft, but he did not sign with the team, choosing instead to enroll at Cal Poly, to play for the Cal Poly Mustangs.

While at Cal Poly, Haniger played right field as a freshman and sophomore, and center field as a junior. Haniger was named the 2010 Big West Conference Freshman of the Year following his debut season with the Mustangs, a year in which he batted an impressive .325.

Following his freshman season at Cal Poly, Haniger spent the summer of 2010 playing wood bat baseball as part of the Corvallis Knights of the West Coast League, hitting .299 over 134 at bats with the team, racking up 11 stolen bases in 38 games played. Haniger was named a member of the first-team All-WCL Team and was rated as the WCL's No. 5 pro prospect by Baseball America following the 2010 summer schedule.

His sophomore season proved less successful at the plate than his freshman year, but Haniger nevertheless managed to bat .275/.371/.466 in 189 at bats. He once again spent the summer playing wood bat collegiate ball, this time in the colors of the Green Bay Bullfrogs of the Northwoods League. 

His summer work paid dividends, paving the way for an offensive explosion in 2012, during which spent much of the year heading the Big West Conference in the power categories of home runs, runs batted in, and slugging percentage. Haniger finished the season batting .346 (7th in the league)/.438(3rd)/.626(first) in 211 at bats with 48 runs (3rd), 18 doubles (6rd), 13 home runs (first), 64 RBIs (first), 36 walks (4th), and 7 sacrifice flies (first). Haniger won the league's highest plaudit, being named the 2012 Big West Conference Player of the Year and gained national recognition as an All-American.

Professional career

Milwaukee Brewers

The Milwaukee Brewers selected Haniger as a supplemental draft pick at the end of the first round of the 2012 MLB draft — the 38th overall selection. The pick with which Haniger was selected was awarded to the Brewers as partial compensation for the loss of slugger Prince Fielder to the Detroit Tigers in the 2011-12 offseason. Haniger's signing bonus with the Brewers was $1.2 million — less than the $1.359 million bonus for his draft slot recommended by the MLB. After signing with the Brewers, Haniger was dispatched to the team's affiliate in Appleton, Wisconsin, where he appeared in 14 games for the Wisconsin Timber Rattlers of the Class A Midwest League. He missed most of the 2012 season with a partial tear of his posterior cruciate ligament in his right knee, which he injured on a play at the plate.

In 2013, Haniger began the season rated the 10th-best prospect and best outfield arm in the Brewers organization by Baseball America. With Wisconsin, before being promoted to the Brevard County Manatees of the Class A-Advanced Florida State League. Combined, Haniger had a .264 batting average, a .348 on-base percentage, 11 home runs, and 68 runs batted in. After the 2013 season, the Brewers assigned Haniger to play for the Surprise Saguaros of the Arizona Fall League. He was named co-player of the week, along with Kris Bryant, in the first week of the fall league season. He batted .280/.354/.480 in 100 at bats, and was named to the AFL All-Prospect team.

The Brewers invited Haniger to spring training in 2014. Failing to make the cut for the team's 25-man roster, Haniger was assigned to the Huntsville Stars of the Class AA Southern League to begin the season. Entering the season, he was rated the third-best prospect in the organization by Baseball America.

Arizona Diamondbacks

On July 31, 2014, the Brewers traded Haniger and Anthony Banda to the Arizona Diamondbacks for Gerardo Parra. The Diamondbacks assigned him to the Mobile BayBears of the Southern League. Haniger began the 2015 season with Mobile. Though he batted .281/.351/.379 in 153 at bats for Mobile, the Diamondbacks demoted Haniger to the Visalia Rawhide of the Class A-Advanced California League in June so that he could play more frequently. With Visalia he hit .332(8th in the California League/.381/.619(4th) in 202 at bats. He spent the 2015 season retooling his batting stance and swing to focus on generating more power.

Haniger began the 2016 season with Mobile, with whom he batted .294/.407(5th in the league)/.462 with 8 hit by pitch (6th) in 236 at bats, and was named to the Southern League midseason All Star team. He was promoted to the Reno Aces of the Class AAA Pacific Coast League during the season. After batting .341/.428/.670 in 261 at bats with 20 home runs for Reno, he was named a 2016 PCL All Star. After the season he was named the Diamondbacks Minor League Player of the Year. 

The Diamondbacks called up Haniger to the major leagues on August 16, 2016. Haniger played his first major league game against the New York Mets that day, becoming the first Diamondbacks player to have a triple as his first major league hit. Haniger also set a record as the first player in Diamondbacks history to tally three RBIs in his inaugural game. For the 2016 season with the Diamondbacks, he hit .229/.309/.404 in 109 at bats. He played 22 games in center field, nine in left field, and four in right field.

Seattle Mariners

On November 23, 2016, the Diamondbacks traded Haniger, Jean Segura, and Zac Curtis to the Seattle Mariners for Taijuan Walker and Ketel Marte.

2017

He was rated the fifth-best prospect in the Mariners' farm system by Baseball America heading into the 2017 season. Haniger began the year as the Mariners' Opening Day right fielder, batting second. On July 29, Haniger was hit in the face by a  fastball from Mets' starting pitcher Jacob DeGrom. On August 19, Haniger hit his first career grand slam off Rays' pitcher Jake Odorizzi at Tropicana Field in his return from the 10-day disabled list. 

Haniger finished 2017, his rookie season, batting .282/.352/.491 in 369 at bats with 58 runs, 16 home runs, and 47 RBIs in 96 games. He played 94 games in right field, six in center field, and two in left field. His range factor of 2.37 per 9 innings was the second-best among AL right fielders, though his five errors were third-most.

2018

Coming off a productive, yet injury-shortened, rookie campaign, Haniger finished the first half of the season hitting .272/.358/.488 with 18 home runs and 67 RBIs. Haniger was named to the 2018 MLB All-Star Game in Washington, D.C., his first ever All-Star Game selection. 

Haniger's breakout season ended with a .285/.366/.493 slash line in 596 at bats (7th in the AL) with 58 runs, 26 home runs, 93 RBIs (10th), and 7 sacrifice flies (7th) in 157 games, finishing 11th in AL MVP voting. His 15 game-winning RBIs ranked 6th in the major leagues. He posted a bWAR of 6.5, which ranked 8th-best among American League position players. He reached base at a high frequency, ranking 11th in on-base percentage and tied for 13th in walks in the American League. In addition, he displayed excellent defense in the outfield, tied for most outfield assists in all of baseball (12) and tied for 10th in the AL with 5 defensive runs saved, while leading AL right fielders with 8 errors. His range factor per 9 innings of 2.29 was second-best in the AL. He played 144 games in right field, 35 games in center field, two in left field, and one at DH.

2019-20

Following the departure of star teammates such as Robinson Cano, Nelson Cruz, James Paxton and Edwin Diaz over the offseason, Haniger found himself as the new leader of the rebuilding Mariners team. After a relatively slow start in which he hit .220/.314/.463 in 246 at bats with 46 runs, 15 homers, and 32 RBIs in 63 games, Haniger was placed on the injured list with a ruptured testicle after fouling off a fastball directly in his groin area on June 6, 2019, and missed the remainder of the season. He played 43 games in right field, 24 games in center field, and one game at DH.

Haniger sat out the 2020 season due to numerous surgeries between the offseason and during the pandemic-shortened season.

2021
Haniger returned to baseball in 2021 and had a career year. He was named July 18th AL Player of the Week. 

He hit .253/.318/.486 in 620 at bats (7th in the AL) with 110 runs (6th), 39 home runs (5th), 100 RBIs, 8 sacrifice flies (8th), and 169 strikeouts (8th). He set career highs in home runs, runs batted in, and runs scored. He played 123 games in right field, and 34 at DH. He led the AL in range factor per game as a right fielder (2.22), and was second in fielding percentage (.989). He came in 20th in the voting for MVP.

2022
In 2022 Haniger batted .246/.308/.429 in 224 at bats, with 11 home runs and 34 RBIs. He played 47 games in right field, and 12 at DH.

San Francisco Giants
On December 7, 2022, Haniger signed a three-year, $43.5 million contract with the San Francisco Giants.

International career
On October 29, 2018, Haniger was named to the MLB All-Stars team at the 2018 MLB Japan All-Star Series.

Personal life
Haniger married his high school sweetheart, Amanda Gimenez, in 2016. Their daughter was born in December 2020. The family resides full time in Seattle.

References

External links

1990 births
Living people
American League All-Stars
Arizona Diamondbacks players
Arizona League Diamondbacks players
Baseball players from California
Brevard County Manatees players
Cal Poly Mustangs baseball players
Everett AquaSox players
Huntsville Stars players
Major League Baseball outfielders
Mobile BayBears players
Modesto Nuts players
Reno Aces players
Seattle Mariners players
Sportspeople from Santa Clara, California
Surprise Saguaros players
Tacoma Rainiers players
Wisconsin Timber Rattlers players